Vrbanja is a village and a municipality in Croatia.

Etymology

Vrbanja is named after the Croatian word for willows.

Population

The municipality has a population of 5,174, in the following settlements:
 Soljani, population 1,245
 Strošinci, population 492
 Vrbanja, population 2,203

By ethnicity, 96.48% are Croats, while the largest minority consists of Slovaks (1.38%), per census 2001. With pronounced issue of population decline in eastern Croatia caused by population ageing, effects of the Croatian War of Independence and emigration after the accession of Croatia to the European Union, the population of the municipality dropped to 2,870 residents at the time of 2021 census.

Notable people
Elizabeta Burg, Croatian Beauty Pageant and Miss Universe Top 16 finalist

See also
Vukovar-Syrmia County
Cvelferija
 Drenovci

References

Municipalities of Croatia
Populated places in Syrmia
Populated places in Vukovar-Syrmia County